Whalers Way Orbital Launch Complex is a proposed rocket-launching facility operated by Southern Launch at Whalers Way, in the locality of Sleaford near Port Lincoln on South Australia's Eyre Peninsula.

History of the project
Southern Launch established its headquarters in Adelaide in 2018, before the city was announced as home for the Australian Space Agency. Its offices are located in Pirie Street, Adelaide. 

The launchpad at Whalers Way was publicly announced in December 2018, with Southern Launch leading the project. The project was declared a major development by the state of South Australia on 22 August 2019, and on 23 October 2019 Southern Launch made a joint announcement with Perigee Aerospace of South Korea about the launch of the "Blue Whale 1" rocket from the Whalers Way facility.

The facility was officially approved by the Australian Space Agency on 14 July 2021, intended for use to launch commercial satellites.

Southern Launch planned to build two launch pads for orbital launches to polar and sun-synchronous orbits. Pad 1 was expected to host up to three test launches by the end of 2021.

Launches
When fully operational, it is anticipated that around 25 launches a year will take place at Whalers Way.

Perigee Aerospace became the first customer with a planned launch of its rocket "Blue Whale 1" in July 2020. However, this had not been launched by late August.

On 16 September 2021, 06:39 UTC the Taiwanese TiSPACE-company's Hapith I rocket (flight VS01) launched from Whalers Way Pad 1 on a suborbital test flight, after two aborted launches. This was the maiden flight of Hapith I and first of three test launches from Pad 1 at Whalers Way. The flight suffered a launch failure at ignition, causing the rocket to catch fire.

Two more test launches of the vehicle, conducted by ATSpace under the Kestrel I name, are scheduled for late 2022.

Environmental concerns
Concerns have been raised by environmentalists from the Nature Conservation Society of South Australia (NCSSA) and traditional owners the Nauo people , as threatened species such as the southern emu wren and white-bellied whipbird inhabit the area , which could be affected by the noise, and there are places of cultural significance to the Nauo people. Environmental impact assessments were being undertaken as of May 2021, with plans to modify the site and implement mitigation strategies should problems be found. Southern Launch has committed to protecting nature and managing tourism activities to ensure that the environment will be preserved.

Protests took place at the site ahead of the first scheduled launch on 9 September 2021, after whales were reported swimming in Fishery Bay, east of the maritime exclusion zone, and police attended. Whales were later confirmed 30km away in Boston Bay, and none observed in Fishery Bay. Local residents and conservationists, including the Nature Conservation Society, Wilderness Society, Conservation Council of South Australia, the National Trust of Australia (SA), Birds SA and  Trees for Life  have been calling for an independent review. An ecologist from the University of Adelaide and the NCSSA are concerned that the extensive clearing ( of vegetation) and construction work involved in expanding the facility could cause the southern emu wren to become extinct. Southern Launch CEO Lloyd Damp said he was aware of the issues, and they were in the process of working out a better location for launch site A. The expansion plans are under review by the Government of South Australia's PlanSA, as well as the Commonwealth Government for compliance with the Environment Protection and Biodiversity Conservation Act 1999 (EPBC Act). 

Public consultation that closed in September showed strong support from the surrounding communities of Port Lincoln and Tulka, the results of which are yet to be released .

In early October, a rare square-tailed kite was photographed at the site, but it is thought likely that it was a chick from a nest a long distance away. The last time one was spotted on the Eyre Peninsula was in 2004.

See also
Koonibba Test Range, South Australia

References 

Rocket launch sites
Eyre Peninsula